Aubrey Owen Comben (1 September 1904 – 17 April 1972) was an Australian rules footballer who played for the Geelong Football Club in the Victorian Football League (VFL).

Notes

External links 

1904 births
1972 deaths
Australian rules footballers from Melbourne
Geelong Football Club players
People from Werribee, Victoria